Lingig, officially the Municipality of Lingig, is a 2nd class municipality in the province of Surigao del Sur, Philippines. According to the 2020 census, it had a population of 35,142 people.

The municipality is around one and a half hour away from Barangay Mangagoy, Bislig by bus. Similar to Davao Oriental, it is a border town of Surigao del Sur.

Geography

Barangays
Lingig is politically subdivided into 18 barangays.
 Anibongan
 Barcelona
 Bogak
 Bongan
 Handamayan
 Mahayahay
 Mandus
 Mansa-ilao
 Pagtila-an
 Palo Alto
 Poblacion
 Rajah Cabungso-an
 Sabang
 Salvacion
 San Roque
 Tagpoporan (Tagpupuran)
 Union
 Valencia

Climate

Lingig has a tropical rainforest climate (Af) with heavy to very heavy rainfall year-round and with extremely heavy rainfall in January.

Demographics

Economy

References

External links
 Lingig Profile at PhilAtlas.com
 Lingig Profile at the DTI Cities and Municipalities Competitive Index
 [ Philippine Standard Geographic Code]
 Philippine Census Information
 Local Governance Performance Management System

Municipalities of Surigao del Sur